Robert Allen Bjork (born 1939) is Distinguished Professor of Psychology at the University of California, Los Angeles. His research focuses on human learning and memory and on the implications of the science of learning for instruction and training. He is the creator of the directed forgetting paradigm. He was elected a member of the National Academy of Sciences in 2022.

Education and career
He got his BA degree in mathematics from the University of Minnesota in 1961, and then studied psychology under  William Kaye Estes, Richard C. Atkinson, Gordon H. Bower, and James Greeno at Stanford University until he graduated from it in 1966.

He has served as editor of Memory & Cognition (1981–85); editor of Psychological Review (1995–2000); co-editor of Psychological Science in the Public Interest (1998–2004), and chair of a National Research Council Committee on Techniques for the Enhancement of Human Performance (1988–94). His positions of leadership include president of the American Psychological Society (now the Association for Psychological Science); president of the Western Psychological Association; chair of the Psychonomic Society; chair of the Society of Experimental Psychologists; and chair of the Council of Editors of the American Psychological Association (APA). He is currently chair of the Council of Graduate Departments of Psychology. He is a fellow of the Society of Experimental Psychologists, the Society for Experimental Psychology and Cognitive Science, and the James McKeen Cattell Fellow of the American Psychological Society (now the Association for Psychological Science).

References

External links
Publications

1939 births
Educational psychologists
Fellows of the Association for Psychological Science
Fellows of the Society of Experimental Psychologists
Living people
Memory researchers
Stanford University alumni
University of California, Los Angeles faculty
University of Minnesota College of Liberal Arts alumni
Members of the United States National Academy of Sciences